Pomaulax spiratus is a species of sea snail, a marine gastropod mollusk in the family Turbinidae, the turban snails.

Distribution
This species occurs in the Gulf of California, Western Mexico

References

External links
 To World Register of Marine Species

spiratus
Gastropods described in 1911